The 1923 All-Ireland Senior Hurling Championship was the 37th staging of the All-Ireland Senior Hurling Championship, the Gaelic Athletic Association's premier inter-county hurling tournament. The championship began on 20 May 1923 and ended on 14 September 1924.

The championship was won by Galway who secured the title following a 7-3 to 4-5 defeat of Limerick in the All-Ireland final. This was their first All-Ireland title.

Kilkenny were the defending champions but were defeated by Galway in the All-Ireland semi-final.

Results

Leinster Senior Hurling Championship

Munster Senior Hurling Championship

Ulster Senior Hurling Championship

All-Ireland Senior Hurling Championship

Semi-finals

Final

Championship statistics

Miscellaneous

 Donegal win the Ulster championship for the first time since 1906.
 The All-Ireland semi-final between Limerick and Donegal marked the first time that players wore numbers on the backs of their jerseys.  It is also the first and to date the only championship meeting between the two teams.
 Galway win the All-Ireland title for the first time in the history of the championship.

Sources

 Corry, Eoghan, The GAA Book of Lists (Hodder Headline Ireland, 2005).
 Donegan, Des, The Complete Handbook of Gaelic Games (DBA Publications Limited, 2005).
 Fullam, Brendan, Captains of the Ash (Wolfhound Press, 2002).

References

1923
All-Ireland Senior Hurling Championship